Glenglassaugh distillery is a malt scotch whisky distillery which restarted production in November 2008 after being acquired by an independent investment group. Following a complete refurbishment by the new owners the distillery was re-opened on 24 November 2008 by the First Minister for Scotland Alex Salmond.

History
The Glenglassaugh Distillery is a single malt Scotch whisky distillery located in a picturesque site just outside the Speyside region in Northeast Scotland, close to the small town of Portsoy, Banffshire some 54 miles Northwest of Aberdeen. The Distillery was established in 1875 by a local entrepreneur James Moir and his two nephews, Alexander and William Morrison. James Moir had an expanding grocery business in the town of Portsoy and was wanting to establish a distillery that would produce a whisky of the highest quality to satisfy the growing demand from his customers. The site was originally chosen due to its proximity to a clean and pure water supply (Glassaugh Springs), easy access to the nearby barley fields and because it was known locally to have been the site of one of the many illicit distilleries that had operated in the area and which had produced excellent whisky. Following the death of both James Moir and William Morrison, Alexander Morrison was forced to sell the distillery and in 1892 the company was sold to Highland Distillers and until 2008 has been owned by them. Highland Distillers are a subsidiary of The Edrington Group.

In 1960 it was rebuilt and upgraded to double the production capacity and to yield lighter spirit. However, in 1986, when the whole whisky industry was reviewing operations the economics of running this relatively small and remote distillery, the owners decided that they should stop production. Around this time, Glenglassaugh was sold to the Edrington Group. The whisky from this distillery had traditionally been used in the production of blended whiskies such as Cutty Sark, Laing's, and The Famous Grouse.

In 2008, Glenglassaugh was purchased by the Scaent Group. Under new ownership, it released some the pre-1986 stock as exclusive Highland single malt scotch whiskies with outstanding success. At the 2009 International Wine and Spirit Competition awards the 30 Year Old expression was awarded a Gold Medal (Best in Class) and the trophy for Best Cask Strength Scotch Whisky and the 40 Year Old was awarded Gold Medal (Best in Class) and the trophy for Best 40 Year Old Scotch Whisky. The 40 year old was also awarded Best 40 Year Old Scotch Whisky and 96 points in Jim Murray's 2010 Whisky Bible.

Upon purchase, Scaent refurbished the mothballed distillery and restarted production. In 2009 the company also introduced 2 new innovative products which are produced using the same process as that used for making single malt scotch whisky but without the ageing process. "The Spirit Drink that dare not speak its name" is the result of 1 mash of malted barley, fermented and distilled twice. The product is bottled without ageing at 50% abv.

"The Spirit Drink that blushes to speak its name" is also produced in the same way but is allowed to age for 6 months in casks that have previously held red wine. The result is a spirit with a rich rose hue and a flavour of soft fruits and spices and is ideal as a cocktail base or for making long drinks.

On 16 December 2011 the first bottling of Glenglassaugh whisky from spirit distilled under the present ownership was bottled and released for sale only from the distillery shop.

In March 2013, The BenRiach Distillery Company acquired the Glenglassaugh distillery from its previous owners, who were listed as Amsterdam-based Lumiere Holdings. Benriach Distillery company also operates the Benriach and Glendronach Distilleries.

In June 2016, Brown-Forman Corporation acquired the BenRiach Distillery Company and its subsidiaries, therefore making Brown-Forman the current owners of the Glenglassaugh distillery.

The history of Glenglassaugh distillery up to and including the first launches by the Scaent Group was described by whisky writer Ian Buxton in his book Glenglassaugh: A Distillery Reborn (NWP, Glasgow. July 2010). Buxton also worked as marketing consultant and adviser to the relaunch.

Gallery

See also
 Glassaugh railway station - once provided transport for distillery workers

References

Notes

Bibliography

External links

 Glenglassaugh Distillery

Distilleries in Scotland
Scottish malt whisky
1875 establishments in Scotland
Brown–Forman